Greensleeves Rhythm Album #35: Clappas is an album in Greensleeves Records' rhythm album series.  It was released in February 2003 on CD and LP.  The album features various artists recorded over the "Clappas" riddim.  The riddim was produced by the South Rakkas Crew production team.  The rhythm is inspired by Norman Greenbaum's hit pop song "Spirit in the Sky" and contains elements of Wayne Smith's hit Under Me Sleng Teng.  The album includes the hit song "Under Mi Sensi" by Mr. Vegas, Alozade & Hollow Point, which is a take on the Barrington Levy classic by the same name.

Track listing

"Under Mi Sensi" - Mr. Vegas, Alozade & Hollow Point
"Mr. Lover" - Elephant Man
"Wha Dat?" - Capleton
"Hotta, Betta, Phatta" - Ward 21
"Clap Your Hands" - Mr. Vegas
"U Good To Go" - Vybz Kartel
"Spotlight" - Sizzla
"Honey" - Ce'Cile
"Bring It On" - Beenie Man & T.O.K.
"Kaos" - Harry Toddler
"It's About Time" - Tanya Stephens
"Double Sick" - Mad Cobra
"Clappin'" - Capleton & The David House Crew
"Ghetto Pickney" - Mr. Vegas ft. Illa & Aisha
"Nuh Inna It" - Determine
"Talk" - Pickney
"Have Dat Lock" - Assassin
"I'm a Grown Man" - Lexxus
"Part Time Lover" - Irish Man
"All The Girls" - Jagwa
"Luv Up Mi Girl" - Chuck Fender
"2 Pack of Slam" - Merciless

2003 compilation albums
Reggae compilation albums
Greensleeves Records albums